Kelly Joe Goodburn (born April 14, 1962) is a former American football punter with a seven-year career in the National Football League.  He entered the NFL by signing as a free agent with the Kansas City Chiefs in 1987.  He played in Super Bowl XXVI for the Washington Redskins and attended Iowa State University and Emporia State University. Goodburn was raised in the small town of Cushing, Iowa where he led the Eastwood Raiders to an Iowa High School Athletic Association State Championship in 1978.

External links

1962 births
Living people
People from Cherokee, Iowa
American football punters
Iowa State Cyclones football players
Emporia State Hornets football players
Kansas City Chiefs players
Washington Redskins players
People from Woodbury County, Iowa
National Football League replacement players